David H. Bayley (March 26, 1933 – May 10, 2020) was an American political scientist who taught at the University of Denver and the State University of New York at Albany.  He was dean of SUNY Albany's School of Criminal Justice from 1995-2004 and was Distinguished Professor Emeritus.  He authored 18 books, and he became a "policing research pioneer." Bayley was described in 2015 as “America’s principal, most respected and longest serving policing expert at-large and the world’s preeminent scholar of international policing studies.”

Selected works

References

2020 deaths
Denison University alumni
Alumni of the University of Oxford
Princeton University alumni
University of Denver faculty
University at Albany, SUNY faculty
American political scientists
1933 births